was a Japanese football player and manager. He played for Japan national team. His brother Akira Matsunaga and Seki Matsunaga also played for Japan national team.

Club career
Matsunaga was born in Shida District, Shizuoka on December 6, 1921. After graduating from Tokyo Liberal Arts and Science University, he played for Nippon Light Metal.

National team career
In March 1954, Matsunaga was selected Japan national team for 1954 World Cup qualification. At this qualification, on March 14, he debuted against South Korea. He also played at 1954 Asian Games. He played 4 games for Japan until 1955.

Coaching career
After retirement, Matsunaga became a manager for Nippon Light Metal. In 1972, he promoted the club to new division, Japan Soccer League Division 2.

On September 25, 2007, Matsunaga died of lymphoma in Fujieda at the age of 85.

National team statistics

References

External links
 
 Japan National Football Team Database

1921 births
2007 deaths
University of Tsukuba alumni
Association football people from Shizuoka Prefecture
Japanese footballers
Japan international footballers
Hagoromo Club players
Footballers at the 1954 Asian Games
Japanese football managers
Association football defenders
Asian Games competitors for Japan
Deaths from lymphoma
Deaths from cancer in Japan